David Tetteh Assumeng is a Ghanaian politician. He was the member of parliament for the Shai Osudoku Constituency from 7 January 2005 to 6 January 2017.

Early life and education
Assumeng was born on 10 September 1961. He hails from Osudoku in the Greater Accra Region of Ghana. He obtained his Diploma from the University of Ghana in 2004 and his Masters in Governance and Leadership (EMGL) from the Ghana Institute of Management and Public Administration (GIMPA) in 2008.

Career
Prior to entering politics, Assumeng was the Youth Co-ordinator of the National Youth Council at the Ada West District.

Politics
Assumeng entered parliament on 7 January 2005 on the ticket of the National Democratic Congress representing the Shai Osudoku Constituency. He lost the NDC primaries in 2015 and was consequently unable to contest for the seat in the 2016 Ghanaian general election. His term in parliament ended on 6 January 2017.

Personal life
Assumeng is married with a child.
He identifies as a Christian and a member of the Presbyterian Church of Ghana.

References

Ghanaian MPs 2005–2009
Ghanaian MPs 2009–2013
Ghanaian MPs 2013–2017
1961 births
Living people